Steven Febey (born 19 August 1969) is a former Australian rules football player for the Melbourne Football Club from Devonport. He is the twin brother of Matthew Febey who he played beside for most of his career.

Febey debuted in 1988 and was a regular in the team throughout the 1990s, wearing guernsey number 21. During the 2001 season he was dropped from the side but came back strongly to finish fourth in the best and fairest. 

When he retired in 2002 with 258 games to his name he held the record for most appearances by a player selected in the national draft. He fell just short of Robert Flower's club record of 272 games and as of 2007 only four people have played more games for the Demons

After the 2002 season, Febey went to Bali with his teammates and was caught up in the bombings which devastated the island. Standing beside former Demons player Steven Armstrong and David Robbins, Febey was about to enter the Sari Club when the car bomb exploded. He escaped with just minor injuries.

He was the only Demon to play in both of Melbourne's 1988 and 2000 losing grand finals.

Statistics

|- style="background-color: #EAEAEA"
! scope="row" style="text-align:center" | 1988
|
| 21 || 12 || 1 || 7 || 91 || 23 || 114 || 24 || 9 || 0.1 || 0.6 || 7.6 || 1.9 || 9.5 || 2.0 || 0.8
|- 
! scope="row" style="text-align:center" | 1989
|
| 21 || 20 || 3 || 1 || 252 || 86 || 338 || 73 || 26 || 0.2 || 0.1 || 12.6 || 4.3 || 16.9 || 3.7 || 1.3
|- style="background-color: #EAEAEA"
! scope="row" style="text-align:center" | 1990
|
| 21 || 23 || 6 || 9 || 256 || 80 || 336 || 77 || 26 || 0.3 || 0.4 || 11.1 || 3.5 || 14.6 || 3.3 || 1.1
|- 
! scope="row" style="text-align:center" | 1991
|
| 21 || 19 || 3 || 8 || 220 || 68 || 288 || 69 || 35 || 0.2 || 0.4 || 11.6 || 3.6 || 15.2 || 3.6 || 1.8
|- style="background-color: #EAEAEA"
! scope="row" style="text-align:center" | 1992
|
| 21 || 14 || 2 || 2 || 121 || 81 || 202 || 44 || 21 || 0.1 || 0.1 || 8.6 || 5.8 || 14.4 || 3.1 || 1.5
|- 
! scope="row" style="text-align:center" | 1993
|
| 21 || 20 || 2 || 5 || 258 || 179 || 437 || 57 || 22 || 0.1 || 0.3 || 12.9 || 9.0 || 21.9 || 2.9 || 1.1
|- style="background-color: #EAEAEA"
! scope="row" style="text-align:center" | 1994
|
| 21 || 25 || 3 || 4 || 301 || 154 || 455 || 66 || 43 || 0.1 || 0.2 || 12.0 || 6.2 || 18.2 || 2.6 || 1.7
|- 
! scope="row" style="text-align:center" | 1995
|
| 21 || 22 || 2 || 4 || 287 || 107 || 394 || 95 || 23 || 0.1 || 0.2 || 13.0 || 4.9 || 17.9 || 4.3 || 1.0
|- style="background-color: #EAEAEA"
! scope="row" style="text-align:center" | 1996
|
| 21 || 5 || 0 || 0 || 38 || 24 || 62 || 10 || 5 || 0.0 || 0.0 || 7.6 || 4.8 || 12.4 || 2.0 || 1.0
|- 
! scope="row" style="text-align:center" | 1997
|
| 21 || 20 || 2 || 6 || 215 || 132 || 347 || 51 || 23 || 0.1 || 0.3 || 10.8 || 6.6 || 17.4 || 2.6 || 1.2
|- style="background-color: #EAEAEA"
! scope="row" style="text-align:center" | 1998
|
| 21 || 25 || 7 || 3 || 309 || 191 || 500 || 77 || 60 || 0.3 || 0.1 || 12.4 || 7.6 || 20.0 || 3.1 || 2.4
|- 
! scope="row" style="text-align:center" | 1999
|
| 21 || 12 || 0 || 2 || 125 || 73 || 198 || 33 || 16 || 0.0 || 0.2 || 10.4 || 6.1 || 16.5 || 2.8 || 1.3
|- style="background-color: #EAEAEA"
! scope="row" style="text-align:center" | 2000
|
| 21 || 21 || 2 || 4 || 239 || 124 || 363 || 55 || 38 || 0.1 || 0.2 || 11.4 || 5.9 || 17.3 || 2.6 || 1.8
|- 
! scope="row" style="text-align:center" | 2001
|
| 21 || 20 || 7 || 2 || 207 || 153 || 360 || 67 || 38 || 0.4 || 0.1 || 10.4 || 7.7 || 18.0 || 3.4 || 1.9
|- class="sortbottom"
! colspan=3| Career
! 258
! 40
! 57
! 2919
! 1475
! 4394
! 798
! 385
! 0.2
! 0.2
! 11.3
! 5.7
! 17.0
! 3.1
! 1.5
|}

References

External links
 

1969 births
Living people
Australian rules footballers from Tasmania
Melbourne Football Club players
Devonport Football Club players
Victorian State of Origin players
Tasmanian Football Hall of Fame inductees
People from Devonport, Tasmania
Australian twins
Twin sportspeople
Allies State of Origin players
Tasmanian State of Origin players